The  is a dam on the border of Mitake and Yaotsu in Gifu Prefecture, Japan. It was built on the upper reaches of the Kiso River system. It was built after World War II as part of a large, nationwide dam building project.

Surrounding area
Sosui Gorge (蘇水峡 Sosui-kyō) was formed by the completion of the dam. Along with Ena Gorge further upstream, the area is part of the Hida-Kisogawa Quasi-National Park.

References

Dams in Gifu Prefecture
Hydroelectric power stations in Japan
Dams completed in 1955
1955 establishments in Japan